Weatheradio Canada is a Canadian weather radio network owned and operated by Environment and Climate Change Canada's Meteorological Service of Canada division that is an official partner of the U.S. National Weather Service. Weatheradio Canada is headquartered in Montreal, Quebec and transmits in both official languages (English and French) from 230 sites across Canada. Weatheradio Canada, like their telephone service, uses the Starcaster Text to Speech, which has been used for many years and is owned by STR-SpeechTech Ltd.

In most locations, the service broadcasts on one of seven specially-allocated VHF radio frequencies, audible only on dedicated "weather band" receivers or any VHF radio capable of receiving 10 kHz bandwidth FM signals centred on these assigned channels, which are located within the larger "public service band". The radio frequencies used by Weatheradio Canada are the same as those used by its American counterpart, NOAA Weather Radio, and receivers designed for use in one country are compatible for use in the other. Since 2004, the service has used Specific Area Message Encoding (SAME) alerting technology to disseminate severe weather bulletins. Weatheradio has indicated that, in 2021, it also plans to add other hazard and civil emergency information (such as natural disasters, technological accidents, AMBER alerts and terrorist attacks) to its broadcasts.

In some locations, primarily national parks, provincial parks and remote communities with little or no local media service, a transmitter operated by the Canadian Broadcasting Corporation carries the service on a standard AM or FM broadcast frequency. As of August 2007, most of these AM and FM transmitters were unlicensed by the CRTC under a special license exemption granted to low-power non-commercial broadcasters.

History 

In 1976, Environment Canada's Weatheradio service was launched and expanded to 30 locations in roughly 10 years. In the early-1990s, increased government investment permitted major expansion of the network to the present size of 230 sites.

In September 2020, Environment and Climate Change Canada began soliciting feedback on possible decommissioning of 48 of its 230 transmitters. ECCC stated that the transmitters were predominantly located in areas of overlapping coverage and where alternate methods of access (such as cell phones and the Internet) were available.

On May 26, 2021, ECCC announced that during the Required Weekly Test, they would announce the transformation of the new voice technology system, which the old one had been in use for over 27 years.  Among the new voices for the service includes Nuance Tom, a newer version of a previous voice on NOAA Weather Radio. These transformations were to begin June 1st and end on New Years Eve of 2021.

On August 19, 2022, an announcement was sent on 8 transmitters in the network regarding the impending decommission of said transmitters within the next 6 months. The 8 transmitters announced for decommissioning were: Cooking Lake, AB; Saskatoon, SK; Orillia, ON; Brockville, ON; Fredericton, NB; Perth-Andover, NB; Aspen-Melrose, NS and Grand Falls, NL.

Frequencies

Weatheradio Canada signals are transmitted using FM (10 kHz bandwidth), with band spacing of 25 kHz. In some areas Weatheradio Canada also transmits on the AM or FM bands. Over 90 per cent of Canadians live within range of a Weatheradio transmitter. Broadcast range for Weatheradio Canada transmitters is between 60 to 80 kilometres depending on things like terrain, the quality of the receiver, and the antenna height above ground, however some areas can receive signals up to 100-130 kilometers from the weather radio when located on top of a mountain or in locations that contains a flat surface. The service uses these frequencies:
162.400 MHz
162.425 MHz
162.450 MHz
162.475 MHz
162.500 MHz
162.525 MHz
162.550 MHz

Programming 

Weather information is broadcast in both official languages which is English first then French. Prior to June 2021, broadcasts in Quebec were in the opposite order. The language order became uniform after new systems were installed. Weather alert broadcasts are inserted within the normal playlist, and are available in both official languages. Wind and wave marine forecasts are broadcast on a regular basis on transmitters located near marine zones. However, these and other forms of marine forecasts are more conveniently broadcast on the marine frequency, which is not available on most weather radios. One requires a special receiver capable of receiving the marine frequency, which varies by province. Weather broadcasts also include the UV index for the forecast day, and for the following day during the UV index season. The index runs from 1 (low) to 11+ (extreme). The air quality health index forecast is broadcast at the end of the broadcast cycle for cities in the station's service area.

See also 

 Alert Ready
 Alberta Emergency Alert
 Interagency Volcanic Event Notification Plan
 Forecast region
 Canadian Location Code
 NOAA Weather Radio
 Specific Area Message Encoding (S.A.M.E.)

References

External links
 Weatheradio Canada
 Weatheradio transmitter directory - Weatheradio Canada
 Weatheradio - Transmitter lists (including AM and FM transmitters) - Weatheradio Canada
 Weatheradio - Transmitter Lists By Province (streema.com)
 DXinfocentre.com's list of Weatheradio transmitters

1976 establishments in Canada
Canadian radio networks
Meteorological Service of Canada
CBC Radio
Weather radio
Emergency population warning systems in Canada